Harris Lloyd "B.B." Seaton (born 3 September 1944), also known as "Bibby", is a Jamaican reggae singer, songwriter, and record producer who was a member of The Gaylads, The Astronauts, Conscious Minds, and The Messengers (along with Ken Boothe, Lloyd Charmers and Busty Brown), and who has had a long solo career dating back to 1960.

Biography
Born in Kingston, Jamaica, Seaton first recorded as a solo artist in 1960 before forming the duo Winston & Bibby with Winston Delano Stewart. The duo were joined by Maurice Roberts and became The Gaylads, although Seaton soon left to join The Astronauts. Seaton rejoined The Gaylads towards the end of the ska era, and they became hugely successful in Jamaica, and their success continued when they were reduced to a duo after Stewart departed. Seaton left in 1972 and restarted his solo career, having several solo hits the same year with "Accept My Apology", "Sweet Caroline", "Lean on Me", and "Thin Line Between Love and Hate".

Seaton's work as a songwriter included songs for Boothe ("The Girl I Left Behind" and "Freedom Street"), The Melodians ("Swing and Dine"), and Delroy Wilson ("Give Love a Try").

Seaton was the first reggae artist to be signed by Virgin Records, leading to the creation of the Front Line label. He became based in the United Kingdom in the mid-1970s where he became active as a producer, his productions including the Gun Court Dub series of dub albums.

Seaton continued to perform into the 2010s as a member of The Gaylads.

Discography

Albums
The Great Ken Boothe Meets BB Seaton & The Gaylads (1971), Jaguar – Ken Boothe, B.B. Seaton, and The Gaylads
Thin Line Between Love and Hate (1973), Trojan
Dancing Shoes (1974), Virgin
Colour is not the Answer (1976), Jama
I'm Aware of Love (1979), Roots Music International
B.B. Seaton Sings the Golden Hits of the Gaylads (1981), Ayana
Everyday People (1985), Revue/Creole
 Wish Me Luck (1989), Challenge Records UK
Just One Moment (1993), Soul Beat
In Control (1995), Soul Beat
Experienced Lover (1996), Soul Beat
Unbeaten (2002)
Reggae Land (2006)
Ready for the World (2009)
I Love Reggae (2013)
Reggae Country Classics Volume One (Pioneer International)

Compilations
Greatest Hits (1996), Rhino
Rootically Yours (2000), Soul Beat
Seal of Approval (2003), Soul Beat – B.B. Seaton & The Gaylads
After All This Time: The Anthology 1972–1989 (2007), Soul Beat

Productions
Gun Court Dub (1975), Love
Revolutionary Dub (1976), Trenchtown
Gun Court Dub vol. 2 (????), Soul Beat
Gun Court Dub vol. 3 (????), Soul Beat
Gun Court Dub vol. 4 (2001), Soul Beat

References

External links

Biography at reggae-vibes.com

1944 births
Living people
Musicians from Kingston, Jamaica
Jamaican male singers
Jamaican reggae singers